Sifra (Aramaic: סִפְרָא) is the Halakhic midrash to the Book of Leviticus. It is frequently quoted in the Talmud, and the study of it followed that of the Mishnah. Like Leviticus itself, the midrash is occasionally called "Torat Kohanim", and in two passages also "Sifra debei Rav". According to Leḳaḥ Ṭob this latter title was applied originally to the third book of the Pentateuch because Leviticus was the first book studied in the elementary school, and it was subsequently extended to the midrash; but this explanation is contradicted by analogous expressions such as "Sifre debei Rav" and, in a broader sense, "ketubot debei Rav" and "teḳi'ata debei Rav".

Authorship 
Maimonides and others have declared that the title "Sifra debei Rav" indicates Rav as the author of the Sifra; and this opinion I.H. Weiss attempts to support. His proofs are not conclusive, though neither are the opposing arguments of Friedmann who tries to show that the expression "Sifra debei Rav" does not refer to the midrash under discussion.

The question of authorship has been correctly answered by Malbim, who proves in the introduction to his Sifra edition that R. Ḥiyya was the redactor of the Sifra. There are no less than 39 passages in Yerushalmi and the midrashim in which expositions found also in the Sifra are quoted in the name of R. Ḥiyya, and the fact that no tannaim subsequent to Rebbi are mentioned in the Sifra supports the view that the book was composed during the time of that scholar. The omission from the Sifra of some interpretations of Leviticus which are elsewhere quoted in the name of R. Ḥiyya cannot be taken as proving the contrary; nor does the fact that Ḥiyya himself is mentioned in the Sifra offer any difficulty. Indeed, as Hoffmann shows, in the three passages in which it can with certainty be said that the reference is to R. Ḥiyya himself, he refers to preceding interpretations, indicating that he is the editor.

It is perhaps doubtful whether Hoffmann is correct in comparing the above-mentioned passages, or the final remark of R. Joshua in Ḳinnim, with Middot 2:5. But even if Hoffmann's view does not seem acceptable, it is not necessary to infer that Rav was the editor of the Sifra; for he may merely have added the passages in question, just as he seems to have made an addition to Sifra 12:2, following Niddah 24b. Nor is Ḥiyya's authorship contradicted by various contradictions presented by individual passages in the Sifra as compared with the Tosefta, which latter also is ascribed to him.

If it is assumed that Ḥiyya is the author, the title "Sifra debei Rav" is to be explained as indicating that Sifra was among the midrashim which were accepted by Rav's school and which thereby came into general use. The name is differently explained by Hoffmann who, on the basis of Ḥullin 66a and in conformity with Rashi ad loc., takes "bei Rav" to mean "school" in general, and who accordingly differentiates between "Tanna debei Rav" and "Tanna debe R. Ishmael," i.e., between the midrashim of R. Akiva's school (which, being decisive for the Halakah, were generally studied) and those of R. Ishmael's school (which were not intended for general use, though they were studied by some and were consulted occasionally, as was the case with other midrash collections which are quoted only rarely). Hoffmann himself admits, however, that the expression "de-bet Rav" in Yerushalmi certainly indicates Rav's school; so that it is in any case doubtful whether a different usage is to be assumed in the case of the Babylonian Talmud.

As regards the sources of Sifra, the Talmud states "An anonymous Sifra is Rabbi Yehudah". That the Sifra belongs to R. Akiva's school, as the above-mentioned passage in Sanhedrin indicates, is shown by the principles of exposition contained in the Sifra; e.g., that where the same expression occurs in two different laws the phrase need not be "mufneh" (pleonastic) in one of them in order to permit of its being used for "gezerah shavah"  (argument from analogy); the double use of the expression being explained in accordance with the principles of "ribbui u-mi'uṭ" and "kelal uperaṭ." Certain peculiarities of phraseology are likewise noteworthy: יכול replaces שומע אני or אקרא, the phrases usually found in the Mekhilta (once a passage beginning אקרא אני is cited as coming from the Sifra, while Sifra Tazria 2:2 in fact has יכול); compare further הא כיצד, וכי איזה מדה מרובה, ואם נפשך לומר, וכי מאין יצאת מכלל שנאמר, וכי מאין באת; and for further details see D. Hoffmann.

Sources 
Traces of R. Judah bar Ilai's influence are less evident. The fact that the views expressed in some "setamot" agree with R. Judah's views has little significance. Such seṭamot may be opposed by others that contradict R. Judah's views.

All this, however, is no reason for attacking the above-mentioned assumption that the Sifra in its principal parts is a midrash of R. Judah's. Hoffmann remarks not incorrectly that Sifra Nedabah 4:12 agrees with the views of R. Eliezer, whose decision R. Judah frequently accepts as handed down by his own father, R. Ila'i, a pupil of R. Eliezer. Similarly, Sifra, Emor, 17:4 et seq. agrees with R. Eliezer's view. Aside from R. Judah's midrash, R. Ḥiyya may have used also R. Simeon's midrash, although some of the passages mentioned there seem to prove little. More doubtful is the relation to R. Ishmael's midrash; and in this connection must be considered the question whether the citation of certain explanations of Leviticus introduced by the formula תנא דבי ר"י and actually found in Sifra is not in part due to confusion.

But to R. Ishmael's school undoubtedly belong the later additions to "'Arayot," which (according to Ḥag. 1:1 and Yer. 1b) were not publicly taught in R. Akiva's school; i.e., Aḥare, 13:3-15; Ḳedoshim, 9:1-7, 11:14, and finally, of course, the so-called Baraita de-Rabbi Yishma'el (beginning). The so-called "Mekilta de-Millu'im" or "Aggadat Millu'im" to Leviticus 8:1-10 is similarly to be distinguished from the remainder of the Sifra. It exists in two recensions, of which the second, covering mishnayot 14-16 and 29-end, is cited by Rashi as "Baraita ha-Nosefet 'al Torat Kohanim she-Lanu." The tannaim quoted most frequently in Sifra are R. Akiva and his pupils, also R. Eliezer, R. Ishmael, R. Jose ha-Gelili, Rebbi, and less often R. Jose bar Judah, R. Eleazar bar R. Simeon, and R. Simeon b. Eleazar.

The Present Text 
The Sifra was divided, according to an old arrangement, into 9 "dibburim" and 80 "parashiyyot" or smaller sections. As it exists today it is divided into 14 larger sections and again into smaller peraḳim, parashiyyot, and mishnayot. As the commentators point out, it varies frequently from the Sifra which the Talmudic authors knew; furthermore, entire passages known to the authors of the Babylonian Talmud are missing in the present Sifra, and, on the other hand, there are probably passages in the present Sifra which were not known to the Babylonian Talmud.

The Sifra frequently agrees with the Judean rather than with the Babylonian tradition; and Tosefta, Sheḳ. 1:7 likewise agrees with the Sifra. In the few cases where the agreement is with the Babylonian Talmud, it must not be assumed that the text of the Sifra was emended in agreement with the Babylonian Talmud, but that it represents the original version. The Babylonian Talmud, as compared with Yerushalmi, cites Sifra less accurately, sometimes abbreviating and sometimes amplifying it. The Babylonian Talmud occasionally makes use, in reference to the Sifra, of the rule "mi she-shanah zu lo shanah zu" (i.e., the assigning of different parts of one halakah to different authorities), but unnecessarily, since it is possible to harmonize the apparently conflicting sentences and thereby show that they may be assigned to the same authority.

Many errors have crept into the text through the practice of repeating one and the same midrash in similar passages.

Editions 
The Sifra is usually still cited according to the Weiss edition of 1862.

The editions of the Sifra are as follows: Venice, 1545; with commentary by RABaD, Constantinople, 1552; with Ḳorban Aharon, Venice, 1609; with the same commentary, Dessau, 1742; with commentary by J.L. Rapoport, Wilna, 1845; with commentary by Judah Jehiel, Lemberg, 1848; with commentary by Malbim (Meir Loeb b. Yehiel Michael), Bucharest, 1860; with commentary by RABaD and Massoret ha-Talmud by I. H. Weiss, Vienna, 1862 (Reprint New York: Om Publishing Company 1946); with commentary by Samson of Sens and notes by MaHRID, Warsaw, 1866. A Latin translation is given in Biagio Ugolini, Thesaurus, xiv.

Other editions include:
 Sifra d'vei rav. Edited by Meir Friedmann (Meir Ish Shalom). Breslau 1915.
 Sifra or Torat Kohanim. Edited by Finkelstein, Louis and Morris Lutzki . New York: JTS, 1956. (Facsimile edition of Codex Assemani 66 of the Vatican Library)
 Sifra on Leviticus I-V. Edited by Louis Finkelstein. New York: JTS 1989–1990.
 Sifra: An Analytical Translation I-III. Translated by Jacob Neusner. Atlanta: Scholars Press 1988.
 Sifra on Leviticus, with traditional commentaries and variant readings. Edited by Abraham Shoshanah. Cleveland and Jerusalem 1991 onwards.

External links 
 Sifra Hebrew Text
 Sifra English translation and original text

References 

Halakhic Midrashim
Book of Leviticus
Sifrei Kodesh